Mariusz Fyrstenberg and Marcin Matkowski were the defending champions, but lost in the semifinals to František Čermák and Leoš Friedl.

František Čermák and Leoš Friedl won in the final 6–4, 6–4, against José Acasuso and Ignacio González King.

Seeds

Draw

Draw

External links
Draw

Doubles